Charles N. Sims (May 18, 1835 – March 27, 1908) was an American Methodist preacher and the third chancellor of Syracuse University, serving from 1881 to 1893. Sims Hall and Sims drive on the Syracuse campus is named for him.

Early life 
Sims was born in Fairfield, Indiana in 1835. He graduated in 1859 from Indiana Ashbury University and received a Masters of Arts degree from there in 1861. Sims served as the first president of Valparaiso Male and Female College for two years starting in 1860 before resigning to become a minister. He was granted a Doctor of Divinity degree from Ashbury in 1871. In addition, he received an honorary M. A. from Ohio Wesleyan University (1860) and an honorary LL. D. from Ashbury (1882).

Chancellor of Syracuse University 
After serving as a minister at various institutions, such as the Summerfield Methodist Church of Brooklyn, Sims was approached to become chancellor of Syracuse University in 1881. During his tenure, Sims pushed for the university to pay off debts, establish endowments, and expand the university with new buildings. Holden Observatory was the first building completed under Sims' building fund, and Sims likewise oversaw the construction of the John Crouse Memorial College for Women (now Crouse College). He was supportive of the Syracuse Orangemen football, who played their first game during his presidency in 1889. He retired as chancellor in 1893.

Later life 
Sims returned to Indiana following his retirement. After a few years, he moved once again to Syracuse to become minister of the First Methodist Church. He was made a trustee of the university in 1903. After a final retirement, he returned to Indiana and died in 1908.

Bibliography

References

Further reading

External links

Presidents of Syracuse University
1835 births
1908 deaths
Methodists from Indiana